Strictly Come Dancing returned for its fifth series on 29 September 2007 on BBC One. Bruce Forsyth and Tess Daly returned as co-presenters of the main show on BBC One, while Claudia Winkleman returned to present spin-off show Strictly Come Dancing: It Takes Two on BBC Two. Len Goodman, Bruno Tonioli, Craig Revel Horwood and Arlene Phillips returned to the judging panel for their fifth series.

The first programme was a catch-up show and preview to the new series, before the start of the competition on 6 October. The show ran for 12 weeks, up to 22 December. The show featured 14 new celebrities, who had been paired with 14 professional dancers. In a change to the previous format, the results show was on Sunday, rather than later on Saturday. The fifth series was also the first in which all the professional dancers from the previous year have returned.

The winners of this series were Alesha Dixon and Matthew Cutler.

Couples
This year there were 14 couples: 7 male celebrities and 7 female celebrities. They were:

Scoring chart

Average chart

Highest and lowest scoring performances
The best and worst performances in each dance according to the judges' scores are as follows:

Couples highest and lowest scoring dances

Weekly scores and songs
Unless indicated otherwise, individual judges scores in the charts below (given in parentheses) are listed in this order from left to right: Craig Revel Horwood, Arlene Phillips, Len Goodman, Bruno Tonioli.

Week 1
Running order 

Judges votes to save

 Horwood: Brian & Karen
 Phillips: Kenny & Ola
 Tonioli: Kenny & Ola
 Goodman: Kenny & Ola

Week 2
Running order 

Judges votes to save
 Horwood: Letitia & Darren
 Phillips: Stephanie & Vincent
 Tonioli: Letitia & Darren
 Goodman: Letitia & Darren

Week 3
Running order

Judges votes to save
Horwood: John & Nicole
Phillips: John & Nicole
Tonioli: John & Nicole
Goodman: Did not vote, but would have voted for John & Nicole.

Week 4
Running order

Judges' votes to save
Horwood: Gabby & James
Phillips: Penny & Ian
Tonioli: Penny & Ian
Goodman: Penny & Ian

Week 5
Running order

Judges' votes to save
Horwood: John & Nicole
Phillips: John & Nicole
Tonioli: John & Nicole
Goodman: Did not vote, but would have voted for John & Nicole.

Week 6
Running order

Judges' votes to save
Horwood: Matt & Flavia
Phillips: Penny & Ian
Tonioli: Matt & Flavia
Goodman: Matt & Flavia

Week 7

Running order

Judges' votes to save
Horwood: John & Nicole
Phillips: John & Nicole
Tonioli: John & Nicole
Goodman: Did not vote, but would have voted for John & Nicole.

Week 8
Running order

Judges' votes to save
Horwood: Kelly & Brendan
Phillips: Kelly & Brendan
Tonioli: Kelly & Brendan
Goodman: Did not vote, but would have voted for Kelly & Brendan.

Week 9

Running order

 Kelly & Brendan officially withdrew from the competition, and thus were unable to perform entirely on week 9.

Judges' votes to save
Horwood: Letitia & Darren
Phillips: Letitia & Darren
Tonioli: Letitia & Darren
Goodman: Did not vote, but would have voted for Letitia & Darren.

Week 10: Quarter-final
Running order

Judges' votes to save
Horwood: Alesha & Matthew
Phillips: Alesha & Matthew
Tonioli: Alesha & Matthew
Goodman: Did not vote, but would have voted for Alesha & Matthew.

Week 11: Semi-final

Running order

Judges' votes to save
Horwood: Matt & Flavia
Phillips: Gethin & Camilla
Tonioli: Matt & Flavia
Goodman: Matt & Flavia

Week 12: Final

Running order

Dance chart
 Highest scoring dance
 Lowest scoring dance
 Not performed due to injury

Week 1: Male celebrities – Waltz or Cha-Cha-Cha; Female celebrities – group Swing
Week 2: Female celebrities – Quickstep or Rumba; Male celebrities – group Merengue
Week 3: Tango or Jive
Week 4: American Smooth or Samba
Week 5: Foxtrot or Paso Doble
Week 6: Viennese Waltz or Salsa
Week 7: One unlearned dance
Week 8: One unlearned dance
Week 9: Two unlearned dances (one Ballroom, one Latin)
Week 10: Two unlearned dances (one Ballroom, one Latin)
Week 11: One unlearned dance and Argentine Tango
Week 12 (Final): Favourite Ballroom, favourite Latin, same piece of music, and Showdance

References 

Season 05
2007 British television seasons